Richard Ivey may refer to:
 Richard G. Ivey, businessman and philanthropist, namesake of the Ivey Business School
 Richard M. Ivey (1925–2019), his son, Canadian lawyer and philanthropist